Bouh Ibrahim (born 1 January 1997) is a Djiboutian long-distance runner.

In 2019, he represented Djibouti at the 2019 African Games held in Rabat, Morocco. He competed in the men's 5000 metres and he finished in 8th place. In the same year, he also competed in the men's 5000 metres event at the 2019 World Athletics Championships held in Doha, Qatar. He did not qualify to compete in the final.

References

External links 
 

Living people
1997 births
Place of birth missing (living people)
Djiboutian male long-distance runners
Djiboutian male cross country runners
World Athletics Championships athletes for Djibouti
Athletes (track and field) at the 2019 African Games
African Games competitors for Djibouti